The Tanzer 14 is a Canadian sailboat, that was designed by Johann Tanzer and first built in 1970. The design is out of production.

Production
The boat was built by Tanzer Industries in Canada, but production had ended by the time the company went out of business in 1986.

Design
The Tanzer 14 is a small recreational sailing dinghy, built predominantly of fibreglass. It has a fractional sloop rig, a transom-hung rudder and a centreboard keel. It displaces .

See also
List of sailing boat types

References

Dinghies
1970s sailboat type designs
Sailing yachts
Sailboat type designs by Johann Tanzer
Sailboat types built by Tanzer Industries